Loyalton may refer to:

Loyalton, California, a city in Sierra County
Loyalton, Pennsylvania, an unincorporated community in Dauphin County
Loyalton, South Dakota, an unincorporated community in Edmunds County